Wanne-Eickel Hauptbahnhof is a railway station in the former city of Wanne-Eickel, now part of Herne in western Germany.

History 
The station grew out of the Pluto-Thies freight yard, opened in 1856 on the Duisburg–Dortmund line section of the Cologne-Minden Railway Company's trunk line, which was opened in 1847. In 1864, a halt was opened there for passengers. In 1867 a new freight yard was opened, which was initially called Pluto, but changed to Wanne (literally “basin”, a description of the landscape) in 1869, because the surrounding villages could not agree on a name for the yard. The station's name was reflected in 1875 when the villages of Eickel, Bicker, Crange, Holsterhausen and Röhlinghausen were merged under the name of Amt Wanne.

With the opening of the line to Münster on 1 January 1870, Wanne station became a railway junction. In 1913 the station building and the track work were rebuilt and extended.

After the formation of the city of Wanne-Eickel in 1926, the station was renamed Wanne-Eickel Hauptbahnhof. It became the largest marshalling yard in the central Ruhr area and the only station in the Ruhr that included all four forms of rail operations: in addition to its role as a marshalling yard, it was the home depot for over 300 locomotives along with associated rolling stock, a freight yard and a passenger station.

Current operations
Wanne-Eickel Hauptbahnhof is a station of major traffic importance as a crossroads on the east-west Dortmund–Duisburg line and the north-south Münster–Essen line, which among other things, is the beginning of the Rollbahn (rolling railway) to Hamburg. In addition, the station is located on the Emscher Valley Railway (Dortmund–Wanne-Eickel–Dorsten) and the Bochum–Gelsenkirchen Railway (also known as the Glückauf-Bahn— a reference to Glück auf, the traditional German miners greeting). Part of the old marshalling yard still operates with shunting from west to east over a hump, but other freight operations are closed.

Following the merger of the cities of Herne and Wanne-Eickel in 1975 the name of the station remained as Wanne–Eickel Hauptbahnhof, although it is the largest station in the city of Herne on its current boundaries. In 2003, Deutsche Bahn planned to rename it Herne-Wanne or Herne Hauptbahnhof. However, these plans met with considerable resistance in the Wanne area, as well as from local politicians in Herne.

Lines

Long-distance
Wanne-Eickel is served by one InterCity service:

Regional

Wanne-Eickel is served by the two Regional-Express and three Regionalbahn lines, as well as the Rhine-Ruhr S-Bahn.

Notes

External links 

Railway stations in North Rhine-Westphalia
S2 (Rhine-Ruhr S-Bahn)
Rhine-Ruhr S-Bahn stations
Buildings and structures in Herne, North Rhine-Westphalia
Railway stations in Germany opened in 1864